Tate's Cairn or Tai Lo Shan is a mountain in Hong Kong at  in height. It is one of the peaks of the Kowloon Ridge and falls within Ma On Shan Country Park. The peak began to appear on colonial maps in the 1860s but remained unnamed until the beginning of the 20th century.

Background
The origins of the peak's English name is unknown, but it may originate from maps created by a surveyor named George Passman Tate, Assistant Superintendent of Indian Survey Department who is responsible for government maps of Hong Kong and New Territories in 1899 and 1900.

Built in 1991 at a cost of HK$2 billion, Tate's Cairn Tunnel is a -long twin-tube vehicular tunnel running north–south beneath the peak.

The Stage 4 to 5 transition of the MacLehose Trail is located beneath the Cairn.

See also

 Gin Drinkers Line
 Gilwell Campsite
 Fei Ngo Shan Road
Eight Mountains of Kowloon

References

Tate's Cairn
Sha Tin District
Wong Tai Sin District